Arthur Thornton (20 July 1854 – 19 April 1915) was an English first-class cricketer.  Thornton was a right-handed batsman.

Born in Wilsden, Bingley,  Yorkshire, Thornton played three first-class matches in 1881 for Yorkshire County Cricket Club against Surrey, Nottinghamshire and Lancashire.

Thornton died in April 1915, aged 60, in Saltaire, Yorkshire.

References

External links
Arthur Thornton at Cricinfo
Arthur Thornton at CricketArchive

1854 births
1915 deaths
Cricketers from Bingley
English cricketers
Yorkshire cricketers